Moira Shire Council is a Local Government Area in the Northern Victoria Region of Victoria, Australia. As at June 2021 the population was 30,018.

It includes the towns of Cobram, Nathalia, Numurkah, Tungamah  and Yarrawonga. It was formed in 1994 from the amalgamation of the Shire of Cobram, Shire of Nathalia, Shire of Numurkah, and parts of the Shire of Tungamah and Shire of Yarrawonga.

The Shire is governed and administered by the Moira Shire Council; its seat of local government and administrative centre is located at the council headquarters in Cobram, it also has a service centre located in Yarrawonga. The Shire is named after the county of Moira, of which the LGA occupies the northern part.

Council

Current composition
The council is composed of nine councillors elected to represent an unsubdivided municipality.

In the wake of a report detailing the "preventable" murder of a senior manager, the Moira Shire council was dismissed by the Minister for Local Government, Melissa Horne on 7 March 2023. An interim administrator has been appointed.  Elections to elect a new council will not be held until 2028.

Administration and governance
The council meets in various locations around the Shire. It also provides customer services at both its administrative centre in Cobram and its service centre in Yarrawonga.

Townships and localities
The 2021 census, the shire had a population of 30,522 up from 29,112 in the 2016 census

^ - Territory divided with another LGA

See also
 List of localities (Victoria)
 List of places on the Victorian Heritage Register in the Shire of Moira

References

External links
 
Moira Shire Council official website
Metlink local public transport map
Link to Land Victoria interactive maps

Local government areas of Victoria (Australia)
Hume (region)